Nalin Wijesinghe (born 27 October 1979) is a Sri Lankan former cricketer. He played in 88 first-class and 58 List A matches between 1998/99 and 2016/17. He made his Twenty20 debut on 17 August 2004, for Sri Lanka Air Force Sports Club in the 2004 SLC Twenty20 Tournament.

References

External links
 

1979 births
Living people
Sri Lankan cricketers
Moratuwa Sports Club cricketers
Panadura Sports Club cricketers
Saracens Sports Club cricketers
Sebastianites Cricket and Athletic Club cricketers
Sri Lanka Air Force Sports Club cricketers
Place of birth missing (living people)